Buang Ruk Gamathep is a Thai drama which aired on Channel 5.
The p'ek is this series is Nawat Kularttanarak and n'ek is Namthip Jongrachatawiboon.

Main cast
Nawat Kularttanarak
Namthip Jongrachatawiboon
Pakorn Namo
Ornjira Larmwilai
Nirut Sirichanya 
Duangta Toongkamee

Thai television soap operas